The 28 provinces of Bulgaria are divided into 265 municipalities (община, obshtina). Municipalities typically comprise multiple towns, villages and settlements and are governed by a mayor who is elected by popular majority vote for a four-year term, and a municipal council which is elected using proportional representation for a four-year term. The creation of new municipalities requires that they must be created in a territory with a population of at least 6,000 and created around a designated settlement. They must also be named after the settlement that serves as the territory's administrative center, among other criteria.

The council of a municipality is further permitted to create administrative subdivisions: mayoralties (kmetstvo), settlements (naseleno myasto), and wards or quarters (rayon). Mayoralties are overseen by elected mayors and typically comprises one or more villages or towns; they must contain a population of at least 250. Settlements are overseen by a manager appointed by the mayor of a municipality and thus have fewer responsibilities and less power than a mayoralty; they must have a population of fewer than 150. Wards are overseen by elected mayors and must include a population of at least 25,000; their creation is required in Bulgaria's three most populous municipalities.

Like municipalities themselves, mayoralties and wards are designated administrative-territorial units, as they have their own elected officials. Settlements, however, are simply designated territorial units since their leaders are appointed.

Blagoevgrad Province

 Bansko Municipality (main town: Bansko)
 Belitsa Municipality (main town: Belitsa)
 Blagoevgrad Municipality (main town: Blagoevgrad)
 Garmen Municipality (main village: Garmen)
 Gotse Delchev Municipality (main town: Gotse Delchev)
 Hadzhidimovo Municipality (main town: Hadzhidimovo)
 Kresna Municipality (main town: Kresna)
 Petrich Municipality (main town: Petrich)
 Razlog Municipality (main town: Razlog)
 Sandanski Municipality (main town: Sandanski)
 Satovcha Municipality (main village: Satovcha)
 Simitli Municipality (main town: Simitli)
 Strumyani Municipality (main village: Strumyani)
 Yakoruda Municipality (main town: Yakoruda)

Burgas Province

 Aytos Municipality (main town: Aytos)
 Burgas Municipality (main town: Burgas)
 Kameno Municipality (main town: Kameno)
 Karnobat Municipality (main town: Karnobat)
 Malko Tarnovo Municipality (main town: Malko Tarnovo)
 Nesebar Municipality (main town: Nesebar)
 Pomorie Municipality (main town: Pomorie)
 Primorsko Municipality (main town: Primorsko)
 Ruen Municipality (main village: Ruen)
 Sozopol Municipality (main town: Sozopol)
 Sredets Municipality (main town: Sredets)
 Sungurlare Municipality (main town: Sungurlare)
 Tsarevo Municipality (main town: Tsarevo)

Dobrich Province

 Balchik Municipality (main town: Balchik)
 Dobrich Municipality (main town: Dobrich)
 Dobrichka Municipality (administrative town: Dobrich)
 General Toshevo Municipality (main town: General Toshevo)
 Kavarna Municipality (main town: Kavarna)
 Krushari Municipality (main village: Krushari)
 Shabla Municipality (main town: Shabla)
 Tervel Municipality (main town: Tervel)

Gabrovo Province

 Dryanovo Municipality (main town: Dryanovo)
 Gabrovo Municipality (main town: Gabrovo)
 Sevlievo Municipality (main town: Sevlievo)
 Tryavna Municipality (main town: Tryavna)

Haskovo Province

 Dimitrovgrad Municipality (main town: Dimitrovgrad)
 Harmanli Municipality (main town: Harmanli)
 Haskovo Municipality (main town: Haskovo)
 Ivaylovgrad Municipality (main town: Ivaylovgrad)
 Lyubimets Municipality (main town: Lyubimets)
 Madzharovo Municipality (main town: Madzharovo)
 Mineralni Bani Municipality (main village: Mineralni Bani)
 Simeonovgrad Municipality (main town: Simeonovgrad)
 Stambolovo Municipality (main village: Stambolovo)
 Svilengrad Municipality (main town: Svilengrad)
 Topolovgrad Municipality (main town: Topolovgrad)

Kardzhali Province

 Ardino Municipality (main town: Ardino)
 Chernoochene Municipality (main village: Chernoochene)
 Dzhebel Municipality (main town: Dzhebel)
 Kardzhali Municipality (main town: Kardzhali)
 Kirkovo Municipality (main village: Kirkovo)
 Krumovgrad Municipality (main town: Krumovgrad)
 Momchilgrad Municipality (main town: Momchilgrad)

Kyustendil Province

 Boboshevo Municipality (main town: Boboshevo)
 Bobov Dol Municipality (main town: Bobov Dol)
 Dupnitsa Municipality (main town: Dupnitsa)
 Kocherinovo Municipality (main town: Kocherinovo)
 Kyustendil Municipality (main town: Kyustendil)
 Nevestino Municipality (main village: Nevestino)
 Rila Municipality (main town: Rila)
 Sapareva Banya Municipality (main town: Sapareva Banya)
 Treklyano Municipality (main village: Treklyano)

Lovech Province

 Apriltsi Municipality (main town: Apriltsi)
 Letnitsa Municipality (main town: Letnitsa)
 Lovech Municipality (main town: Lovech)
 Lukovit Municipality (main town: Lukovit)
 Teteven Municipality (main town: Teteven)
 Troyan Municipality (main town: Troyan)
 Ugarchin Municipality (main town: Ugarchin)
 Yablanitsa Municipality (main town: Yablanitsa)

Montana Province

 Berkovitsa Municipality (main town: Berkovitsa)
 Boychinovtsi Municipality (main town: Boychinovtsi)
 Brusartsi Municipality (main town: Brusartsi)
 Chiprovtsi Municipality (main town: Chiprovtsi)
 Georgi Damyanovo Municipality (main village: Georgi Damyanovo)
 Lom Municipality (main town: Lom)
 Medkovets Municipality (main village: Medkovets)
 Montana Municipality (main town: Montana)
 Valchedram Municipality (main town: Valchedram)
 Varshets Municipality (main town: Varshets)
 Yakimovo Municipality (main village: Yakimovo)

Pazardzhik Province

 Batak Municipality (main town: Batak)
 Belovo Municipality (main town: Belovo)
 Bratsigovo Municipality (main town: Bratsigovo)
 Lesichovo Municipality (main village: Lesichovo)
 Panagyurishte Municipality (main town: Panagyurishte)
 Pazardzhik Municipality (main town: Pazardzhik)
 Peshtera Municipality (main town: Peshtera)
 Rakitovo Municipality (main town: Rakitovo)
 Sarnitsa Municipality (main town: Sarnitsa)
 Septemvri Municipality (main town: Septemvri)
 Strelcha Municipality (main town: Strelcha)
 Velingrad Municipality (main town: Velingrad)

Pernik Province

 Breznik Municipality (main town: Breznik)
 Kovachevtsi Municipality (main village: Kovachevtsi)
 Pernik Municipality (main town: Pernik)
 Radomir Municipality (main town: Radomir)
 Tran Municipality (main town: Tran)
 Zemen Municipality (main town: Zemen)

Pleven Province

 Belene Municipality (main town: Belene)
 Cherven Bryag Municipality (main town: Cherven Bryag)
 Dolna Mitropoliya Municipality (main town: Dolna Mitropoliya)
 Dolni Dabnik Municipality (main town: Dolni Dabnik)
 Gulyantsi Municipality (main town: Gulyantsi)
 Iskar Municipality (main town: Iskar)
 Knezha Municipality (main town: Knezha)
 Levski Municipality (main town: Levski)
 Nikopol Municipality (main town: Nikopol)
 Pleven Municipality (main town: Pleven)
 Pordim Municipality (main town: Pordim)

Plovdiv Province

 Asenovgrad Municipality (main town: Asenovgrad)
 Brezovo Municipality (main town: Brezovo)
 Hisarya Municipality (main town: Hisarya)
 Kaloyanovo Municipality (main village: Kaloyanovo)
 Karlovo Municipality (main town: Karlovo)
 Krichim Municipality (main town: Krichim)
 Kuklen Municipality (main town: Kuklen)
 Laki Municipality (main town: Laki)
 Maritsa Municipality (administrative city: Plovdiv)
 Parvomay Municipality (main town: Parvomay)
 Perushtitsa Municipality (main town: Perushtitsa)
 Plovdiv Municipality (main town: Plovdiv)
 Rakovski Municipality (main town: Rakovski)
 Rodopi Municipality (administrative town: Plovdiv)
 Sadovo Municipality (main town: Sadovo)
 Saedinenie Municipality (main town: Saedinenie)
 Sopot Municipality (main town: Sopot)
 Stamboliyski Municipality (main town: Stamboliyski)

Razgrad Province

 Isperih Municipality (main town: Isperih)
 Kubrat Municipality (main town: Kubrat)
 Loznitsa Municipality (main town: Loznitsa)
 Razgrad Municipality (main town: Razgrad)
 Samuil Municipality (main village: Samuil)
 Tsar Kaloyan Municipality (main town: Tsar Kaloyan)
 Zavet Municipality (main town: Zavet)

Ruse Province

 Borovo Municipality (main town: Borovo)
 Byala Municipality (main town: Byala)
 Dve Mogili Municipality (main town: Dve Mogili)
 Ivanovo Municipality (main village: Ivanovo)
 Ruse Municipality (main town: Ruse)
 Slivo Pole Municipality (main town: Slivo Pole)
 Tsenovo Municipality (main village: Tsenovo)
 Vetovo Municipality (main town: Vetovo)

Shumen Province

 Hitrino Municipality (main village: Hitrino)
 Kaolinovo Municipality (main town: Kaolinovo)
 Kaspichan Municipality (main town: Kaspichan)
 Nikola Kozlevo Municipality (main village: Nikola Kozlevo)
 Novi Pazar Municipality (main town: Novi Pazar)
 Shumen Municipality (main town: Shumen)
 Smyadovo Municipality (main town: Smyadovo)
 Varbitsa Municipality (main town: Varbitsa)
 Veliki Preslav Municipality (main town: Veliki Preslav)
 Venets Municipality (main village: Venets)

Silistra Province

 Alfatar Municipality (main town: Alfatar)
 Dulovo Municipality (main town: Dulovo)
 Glavinitsa Municipality (main town: Glavinitsa)
 Kaynardzha Municipality (main village: Kaynardzha)
 Silistra Municipality (main town: Silistra)
 Sitovo Municipality (main village: Sitovo)
 Tutrakan Municipality (main town: Tutrakan)

Sliven Province

 Kotel Municipality (main town: Kotel)
 Nova Zagora Municipality (main town: Nova Zagora)
 Sliven Municipality (main town: Sliven)
 Tvarditsa Municipality (main town: Tvarditsa)

Smolyan Province

 Banite Municipality (main village: Banite)
 Borino Municipality (main village: Borino)
 Chepelare Municipality (main town: Chepelare)
 Devin Municipality (main town: Devin)
 Dospat Municipality (main town: Dospat)
 Madan Municipality (main town: Madan)
 Nedelino Municipality (main town: Nedelino)
 Rudozem Municipality (main town: Rudozem)
 Smolyan Municipality (main town: Smolyan)
 Zlatograd Municipality (main town: Zlatograd)

Sofia City Province

 Sofia Municipality (main town: Sofia)

Sofia Province

 Anton Municipality (main village: Anton)
 Botevgrad Municipality (main town: Botevgrad)
 Bozhurishte Municipality (main town: Bozhurishte)
 Chavdar Municipality (main village: Chavdar)
 Chelopech Municipality (main village: Chelopech)
 Dolna Banya Municipality (main town: Dolna Banya)
 Dragoman Municipality (main town: Dragoman)
 Elin Pelin Municipality (main town: Elin Pelin)
 Etropole Municipality (main town: Etropole)
 Godech Municipality (main town: Godech)
 Gorna Malina Municipality (main village: Gorna Malina)
 Ihtiman Municipality (main town: Ihtiman)
 Koprivshtitsa Municipality (main town: Koprivshtitsa)
 Kostenets Municipality (main town: Kostenets)
 Kostinbrod Municipality (main town: Kostinbrod)
 Mirkovo Municipality (main village: Mirkovo)
 Pirdop Municipality (main town: Pirdop)
 Pravets Municipality (main town: Pravets)
 Samokov Municipality (main town: Samokov)
 Slivnitsa Municipality (main town: Slivnitsa)
 Svoge Municipality (main town: Svoge)
 Zlatitsa Municipality (main town: Zlatitsa)

Stara Zagora Province

 Bratya Daskalovi Municipality (main village: Bratya Daskalovi)
 Chirpan Municipality (main town: Chirpan)
 Galabovo Municipality (main town: Galabovo)
 Gurkovo Municipality (main town: Gurkovo)
 Kazanlak Municipality (main town: Kazanlak)
 Maglizh Municipality (main town: Maglizh)
 Nikolaevo Municipality (main town: Nikolaevo)
 Opan Municipality (main village: Opan)
 Pavel Banya Municipality (main town: Pavel Banya)
 Radnevo Municipality (main town: Radnevo)
 Stara Zagora Municipality (main town: Stara Zagora)

Targovishte Province

 Antonovo Municipality (main town: Antonovo)
 Omurtag Municipality (main town: Omurtag)
 Opaka Municipality (main town: Opaka)
 Popovo Municipality (main town: Popovo)
 Targovishte Municipality (main town: Targovishte)

Varna Province

 Aksakovo Municipality (main town: Aksakovo)
 Avren Municipality (main village: Avren)
 Beloslav Municipality (main town: Beloslav)
 Byala Municipality (main town: Byala)
 Dalgopol Municipality (main town: Dalgopol)
 Devnya Municipality (main town: Devnya)
 Dolni Chiflik Municipality (main town: Dolni Chiflik)
 Provadiya Municipality (main town: Provadiya)
 Suvorovo Municipality (main town: Suvorovo)
 Valchi Dol Municipality (main town: Valchi Dol)
 Varna Municipality (main town: Varna)
 Vetrino Municipality (main village: Vetrino)

Veliko Tarnovo Province

 Elena Municipality (main town: Elena)
 Gorna Oryahovitsa Municipality (main town: Gorna Oryahovitsa)
 Lyaskovets Municipality (main town: Lyaskovets)
 Pavlikeni Municipality (main town: Pavlikeni)
 Polski Trambesh Municipality (main town: Polski Trambesh)
 Strazhitsa Municipality (main town: Strazhitsa)
 Suhindol Municipality (main town: Suhindol)
 Svishtov Municipality (main town: Svishtov)
 Veliko Tarnovo Municipality (main town: Veliko Tarnovo)
 Zlataritsa Municipality (main town: Zlataritsa)

Vidin Province

 Belogradchik Municipality (main town: Belogradchik)
 Boynitsa Municipality (main village: Boynitsa)
 Bregovo Municipality (main town: Bregovo)
 Chuprene Municipality (main village: Chuprene)
 Dimovo Municipality (main town: Dimovo)
 Gramada Municipality (main town: Gramada)
 Kula Municipality (main town: Kula)
 Makresh Municipality (main village: Makresh)
 Novo Selo Municipality (main village: Novo Selo)
 Ruzhintsi Municipality (main village: Ruzhintsi)
 Vidin Municipality (main town: Vidin)

Vratsa Province

 Borovan Municipality (main village: Borovan)
 Byala Slatina Municipality (main town: Byala Slatina)
 Hayredin Municipality (main village: Hayredin)
 Kozloduy Municipality (main town: Kozloduy)
 Krivodol Municipality (main town: Krivodol)
 Mezdra Municipality (main town: Mezdra)
 Miziya Municipality (main town: Miziya)
 Oryahovo Municipality (main town: Oryahovo)
 Roman Municipality (main town: Roman)
 Vratsa Municipality (main town: Vratsa)

Yambol Province

 Bolyarovo Municipality (main town: Bolyarovo)
 Elhovo Municipality (main town: Elhovo)
 Straldzha Municipality (main town: Straldzha)
 Tundzha Municipality (administrative town: Tundzha)
 Yambol Municipality (main town: Yambol)

See also
Bulgaria
Provinces of Bulgaria
List of cities and towns in Bulgaria
List of villages in Bulgaria

References

Bulgaria, Municipalities
Bulgaria 2
Municipalities, Bulgaria
Lists of populated places in Bulgaria
Bulgaria